Joe Hirsch (February 27, 1928 – January 9, 2009) was an American horse racing columnist and the founding president of the National Turf Writers Association.

Biography
He earned a degree in journalism from New York University, then served with the United States Army for four years. He joined the staff of the New York Times but remained only a short time before going to work at The Morning Telegraph, then the companion paper of the Daily Racing Form, with which he became associated in 1954 and retired from as its executive columnist in 2003.

Often referred to as the "dean" of Thoroughbred racing writers, Hirsch is one of two American writers (the other is John Englehardt) to win both the Eclipse Award for outstanding writing and the Lord Derby Award in London from the Horserace Writers and Reporters Association of Great Britain. He also received the Eclipse Award of Merit (1992), the Big Sport of Turfdom Award (1983), and The Jockey Club Medal (1989), and was designated as the honored guest at the 1994 Thoroughbred Club of America's Testimonial Dinner. The annual Grade 1 Joe Hirsch Turf Classic Invitational at Belmont Park was named in his honor, as are the press boxes at the Saratoga Race Course and Churchill Downs racecourses. The Breeders' Cup Ltd. presents the Joe Hirsch Award to a member of the media for their coverage of the Breeders' Cup.

In 2005, the University of Kentucky and the National Thoroughbred Racing Association (NTRA) announced the creation of the Joe Hirsch Scholarship to assist a worthy student interested in pursuing a career in Thoroughbred racing journalism. The first recipient of the scholarship was Ms Amanda Duckworth.

Hirsch is also known for being the roommate to New York Jets rookie quarterback Joe Namath upon his arrival in New York City.

Until his death, Hirsch served as a member of the selection committee for the National Museum of Racing and Hall of Fame. He died early in the morning on January 9, 2009, at St. Luke's Hospital in New York City.

See also
 Joe Hirsch Turf Classic Stakes

Bibliography
 First Century : Daily Racing Form chronicles 100 years of Thoroughbred Racing (1996)
 The Grand senor : The Fabulous Career of Horatio Luro (1989)
 Kentucky Derby : The Chance of a Lifetime  (1988) co-authored with Jim Bolus.
 In The Winner's Circle: The Jones Boys of Calumet Farm (1974) co-authored with Gene Plowden
 A Treasury of Questions and Answers from the Morning Telegraph and Daily Racing Form - Illustrations by Peb (1969)

References

External links
 Joe Hirsch's retirement notice in the Daily Racing Form
 University of Kentucky website - Joe Hirsch Scholarship

1929 births
2009 deaths
Deaths from Parkinson's disease
Neurological disease deaths in New York (state)
New York University alumni
University of Kentucky people
American sportswriters
Horse racing in the United States
Eclipse Award winners
Jewish American writers
20th-century American Jews
21st-century American Jews